Established in 2006, Bhangra Empire is a San Francisco Bay Area dance team in California. The team is composed of undergraduates, graduate students, and recent graduates pursuing a variety of career paths while taking time to pursue Bhangra and Punjabi culture.  The team has won 16 awards in four years.

Popular culture

President Obama's first State Dinner 

On November 24, 2009, Bhangra Empire performed at the first State Dinner hosted by President Barack Obama and the First Lady, Michelle Obama. The event honored its chief guest Prime Minister of India, Manmohan Singh and was held on the South Lawn of the White House in Washington, D.C.

Along with Bhangra Empire, the entertainment lineup included the National Symphony Orchestra, A.R. Rahman, Kurt Elling, and Jennifer Hudson.

The guest list included a mix of prominent figures in United States and Indian politics, business, and entertainment, including the President and First Lady, Secretary of State Hillary Clinton, Colin Powell, Bobby Jindal, Dr. Sanjay Gupta, Steven Spielberg, M. Night Shyamalan, Alfre Woodard, and Blair Underwood.

America's Got Talent (Season 5) 

On Tuesday June 22, 2010, Bhangra Empire made its debut on national television on America's Got Talent (Season 5) with a first round audition in Portland, Oregon. The performance received a standing ovation from the audience and three yeses from celebrity judges Howie Mandel, Piers Morgan, and Sharon Osbourne.

Harper's Bazaar 

Selected by First Lady Michelle Obama as one of the foremost up-and-coming talents in the United States, Bhangra Empire participated in a photo shoot in the White House Ballroom with the First Lady for Harper's Bazaar magazine.  The full article, and photo, were published in the November 2010 issue.

Competitive performances

2010
 Boston Bhangra - 1st place
 Performance video: unavailable
 Held at the Orpheum Theater in Boston, Massachusetts, on November 13, 2010
 VIBC - 3rd place
 Performance video: unavailable
 Held at the Queen Elizabeth Theatre in Vancouver, British Columbia, Canada, on May 9, 2010
 Kollaboration - 1st runner-up
 Performance video: Kollaboration 2010
 Held at the Shrine Auditorium in Los Angeles, California on March 6, 2010
 Elite 8 Bhangra Invitational
 Performance video: Elite 8 2010
 Held at the Lisner Auditorium in Washington, D.C., on February 27, 2010

2009
 Boston Bhangra - 2nd place
 Performance video: unavailable
 Bruin Bhangra - 1st place
 Performance video: Bruin Bhangra 2009
 Best of the Best V - 1st place, 1st overall
 Performance video: Best of the Best 2009
 VIBC - 1st place
 Performance video: VIBC 2009

2008
 Boston Bhangra - 1st place
 Performance video - Boston Bhangra 2008
 Bruin Bhangra - 2nd place
 Performance video - Bruin Bhangra 2008
 Bhangra Fusion
 Performance video - unavailable
 SoCal Bhangra - 1st place
 Performance video - unavailable
 Dhol Di Awaz - 2nd place
 Performance video - Dhol Di Awaz 2008
 Punjabi Showdown - 1st place, most entertaining
 Performance video - Punjabi Showdown 2008

2007
 Rooh Punjab Di - 3rd place
 Performance video: Rooh Punjab Di 2007
 Bhangra Nation West - 1st place
 Performance video: Bhangra Nation West 2007
 Giant Bhangra
 Performance video: Giant Bhangra
 Dhol Di Awaz
 Performance video: Dhol Di Awaz 2007

2006
 Bulldog Bhangra
 Performance video: Bulldog Bhangra 2006
 Nachda Punjab
 Performance video: Nachda Punjab 2006
 Rooh Punjab Di
Performance video: Rooh Punjab Di 2006

Community involvement 
Many of Bhangra Empire's high-energy competitive performances are watched by audiences of over 5000 attendees. In addition to competitive and high-profile performances, Bhangra Empire performs at local community festivals, functions, and charity events.  Bhangra Empire coaches a kids' Bhangra team and teaches bhangra classes at several locations throughout the Bay Area.

See also 
Dance in California

References

External links 
 Bhangra Empire website

Dance in California
Culture in the San Francisco Bay Area
Performing groups established in 2006
2006 establishments in California
America's Got Talent contestants